Abdullah Alawi (Arabic:عبد الله علوي) (born 5 August 1991) is a Qatari footballer. He currently plays for Lusail.

External links

References

Qatari footballers
1991 births
Living people
Aspire Academy (Qatar) players
Al-Rayyan SC players
Qatar SC players
Al-Arabi SC (Qatar) players
Al-Wakrah SC players
Al-Shamal SC players
Lusail SC players
Qatar Stars League players
Qatari Second Division players
Association football fullbacks